Dominic Fedee is a Saint Lucian politician of the United Workers Party. Fedee is the former Minister for Tourism, Information and Broadcasting. He was elected parliamentary representative for Anse la Raye/Canaires in the general election held on 6 June 2016. Fedee was later defeated in the 2021 general election. 

Fedee is former OECS regional Public Relations Officer for Sandals Resorts. He was appointed as an opposition member of the Senate of Saint Lucia in January 2016.

Born in Guyana, Fedee is the brother of cricketer Sergio Fedee.

References

Government ministers of Saint Lucia
Guyanese emigrants to Saint Lucia
Living people
Members of the House of Assembly of Saint Lucia
Members of the Senate of Saint Lucia
United Workers Party (Saint Lucia) politicians
Year of birth missing (living people)